CKRP-FM, branded as Nord-Ouest FM since 2020, is a Canadian French language community radio station that operates at 95.7 FM in Falher, Alberta. The station was established in the early 1990s-via several temporary on-air samples-and signed in October 1996.  From 1996 to 2017, it was operated by the regional ACFA.

On November 21, 2017, it was announced that CKRP-FM would cease to operate.
The station was relaunched under a new committee independent of the ACFA in 2019.

Rebroadcasters

References

External links
CKRP Radio
 
 

Krp
Krp
Krp
2017 disestablishments in Alberta
Radio stations disestablished in 2017
1996 establishments in Alberta
Radio stations established in 1996
2019 establishments in Alberta
Radio stations established in 2019